The Chinese Journal of Chemical Physics (CJCP) is a peer reviewed journal published by the Chinese Physical Society and hosted by the American Institute of Physics. It publishes experimental, computational and theoretical research on the interdisciplinary fields of physics, chemistry, biology and materials sciences. The journal is currently edited by Xue-ming Yang (杨学明) of the Dalian Institute of Chemical Physics, Chinese Academy of Sciences. CJCP publishes around 120 articles per year via bimonthly issues and has an impact factor of 0.496 (2015).

History

CJCP was established in 1988. From 2006 to 2012 its content was hosted by IOP Publishing, and from 2013 by the American Institute of Physics (AIP). As of 2006, the journal started publishing abstracts in Chinese as well.

External links 
 Chinese Journal of Chemical Physics website

References

Physics journals
Chemistry journals
English-language journals
Chinese Physical Society academic journals